Izatha caustopa is a lichen tuft moth in the family Oecophoridae. It is endemic to New Zealand, where it is known very locally, and very infrequently, from the southern half of the North Island: two specimens collected in 2016 were the first seen for 30 years. It is classified as "Data Deficient" by the Department of Conservation.

Taxonomy 
This species was described by Edward Meyrick in 1892 using a female specimen collected by George Hudson in Wellington and named Semiocosma caustopa. Hudson discussed and illustrated the species in his 1928 book The Butterflies and Moths of New Zealand. The genus Semiocosma was subsequently synonymised with Izatha by Meyrick. The holotype specimen is held at the Natural History Museum, London.

Description 
Meyrick originally described the species as follows:

I. caustopa has a rather large wingspan for the genus: 24–26 mm for males and 29–31.5 mm for females.

Distribution
This species is endemic to New Zealand. Although only known very locally this species has been found in the Taupo, Hawkes Bay, and Wellington areas. Hudson noted this species was found in a few patches of tree fuchsia at Gollans Valley and Wilton's Bush, Wellington; he collected his last specimen in 1942. A single specimen was collected in Ohakune in 1921, and two more at Puketitiri (near Napier), in 1964 and 1985. I. caustopa had not been seen for 30 years when two specimens was discovered in 2016 at Bushy Park near Whanganui.

Biology and host species 

Hudson reared the moths from dead branches of kōtukutuku (Fuchsia excorticata) collected in Karori, Wellington. He noted the larvae "feed during the winter months... driving burrows through the soft wood in all directions"—like most lichen tuft moths, they are probably feeding on fungi. They are full grown by about October. Adults have been recorded mostly in January and February, with single records for December and April.

Conservation status and rarity 
This species has been classified as having the "Data Deficient" conservation status under the New Zealand Threat Classification System. Its rarity may be linked to the decline of its host tree, which is a favourite food of introduced possums. It may actually be quite common in small pockets of forest in the North Island, and simply have been overlooked, since it is not attracted to bright light the way most moths are; the specimens at Bushy Park were caught in a Malaise trap.

References

External links 

 Izatha caustopa discussed on Radio NZ Critter of the Week, 22 July 2016
 Image of holotype specimen of I. caustopa

Oecophorinae
Moths of New Zealand
Endemic fauna of New Zealand
Taxa named by Edward Meyrick
Moths described in 1892
Endemic moths of New Zealand